Bomarzo may refer to:

Places and jurisdictions
 Bomarzo, a town and comune of the province of Viterbo, Italy
Gardens of Bomarzo, a garden in Bomarzo
 the former Roman Catholic Diocese of Bomarzo, now a Catholic titular see

Arts
 Bomarzo (novel), a novel by Manuel Mujica Láinez 1962
 Bomarzo (opera), an opera by Alberto Ginastera based on the above novel 1967
 Bomarzo (film), a 1949 documentary by Michelangelo Antonioni